Kunkus (Ancash Quechua kunkush Puya raimondii, Hispanicized spelling Cuncus) is a mountain in the north of the Paryaqaqa mountain range in the Andes of Peru which reaches an altitude of approximately . It is located in the Junín Region, Yauli Province, on the border of the districts of Huay-Huay and Yauli. Kunkus lies north of Chumpi.

References

Mountains of Peru
Mountains of Junín Region